This is a list of the European Music & Media magazine's European Hot 100 Singles and European Top 100 Albums number-ones of 2001.

References

See also
2001 in music
List of number-one hits in Europe

2001 record charts
Lists of number-one albums in Europe
Lists of number-one songs in Europe